Jeffrey Hamilton (born September 4, 1977) is an American former professional ice hockey forward. Hamilton's wife, Jane, is sister of former U.S. women's ice hockey player Helen Resor.

Playing career
Hamilton spent his high school career playing for Avon Old Farms and his college career playing for Yale University where he tallied 80 goals and 174 points in 127 contests, setting the school's all-time scoring mark. In 2001, he signed with Kärpät of the SM-liiga and played there for one season before being signed by the New York Islanders. He played with their American Hockey League (AHL) affiliate, the Bridgeport Sound Tigers, for two seasons before signing with the Hartford Wolf Pack, also of the AHL, in 2004.

In 2005, he started the season playing with Ak Bars Kazan of the Russian Superleague (RSL), but left after playing only eight games. He was then re-signed by the Islanders and sent back to the Sound Tigers.  Jeff scored his first NHL goal on December 17, 2005 against David Aebischer and the Colorado Avalanche during an Islanders 5-4 win.  It was his second career game.

In the summer of 2006, he signed as a free agent with the Chicago Blackhawks. After scoring a career-high 18 goals and 39 points, he signed as a free agent with the Carolina Hurricanes on July 1, 2007. However, in July 2008, he was bought out of his contract and made a free agent.

On September 3, 2008, Hamilton signed with the Chicago Wolves of the AHL.

On March 5, 2009, Hamilton became a member of the Toronto Maple Leafs after the team bought his contract from the Wolves.

On August 5, 2009, Hamilton left North America and signed abroad for HC Lugano of the Swiss National League A. After a season with Lugano, Hamilton returned to familiar stomping grounds in Finland in playing with HIFK of the SM-liiga for the 2010-11 season. His career ended in an injury just before playoffs, but he won the Finnish championship with HIFK after producing at a point-per-game ratio in the regular season.

Career statistics

Regular season and playoffs

International

Awards and honors

References

External links

1977 births
Living people
Ak Bars Kazan players
American men's ice hockey right wingers
Albany River Rats players
Bridgeport Sound Tigers players
Carolina Hurricanes players
Chicago Blackhawks players
Chicago Wolves players
American expatriate ice hockey players in Russia
Hartford Wolf Pack players
HIFK (ice hockey) players
Ice hockey players from Ohio
HC Lugano players
New York Islanders players
Oulun Kärpät players
People from Montgomery County, Ohio
Toronto Maple Leafs players
Undrafted National Hockey League players
AHCA Division I men's ice hockey All-Americans